Veerakeralamputhur taluk is a taluk of Tenkasi district of the Indian state of Tamil Nadu. The headquarters is in the town of Veerakeralampudur.

References 

Taluks of Thirunelveli district